cGh physics refers to the historical attempts in physics to unify relativity, gravitation and quantum mechanics, in particular following the ideas of Matvei Petrovich Bronstein and George Gamow. The letters are the standard symbols for the speed of light (c), the gravitational constant (G), and Planck's constant (h).

If one considers these three universal constants as the basis for a 3-D coordinate system and envisions a cube, then this pedagogic construction provides a framework, which is referred to as the cGh cube, or physics cube, or cube of theoretical physics (CTP). This cube can used for organizing major subjects within physics as occupying each of the eight corners. The eight corners of the cGh physics cube are:
 Classical mechanics (_, _, _)
 Special relativity (c, _, _), gravitation (_, G, _), quantum mechanics (_, _, h)
 General relativity (c, G, _), quantum field theory (c, _, h), non-relativistic quantum theory with gravity (_, G, h)
 Theory of everything, or relativistic quantum gravity (c, G, h)

Other cGh subjects include Planck units, Hawking radiation and black-hole thermodynamics.

While there are several other physical constants, these three are given special consideration, because they can be used to define all Planck units and thus all physical quantities. The three constants are therefore used sometimes as a framework for philosophical study and as one of pedagogical patterns.

Overview 
Before Ole Rømer made the first successful estimate of the speed of light in 1676, it was not known whether the speed of light (c) was infinite or not. Because of the tremendously large value of c (i.e. 299,792,458 metres per second in vacuum) compared to the speeds of things in our daily experience, the propagation of light seems to us to be instantaneous. Hence, the ratio 1/c was hidden from our view making relativistic mechanics irrelevant. At speeds comparable to the speed of light (c), special relativity takes the finitude of the speed of light into consideration by the aid of Lorentz transformation. A non-relativistic theory is recovered from a relativistic theory when the limit 1/c is set to zero.

The gravitational constant (G) is irrelevant for a system where gravitational forces are negligible. For example, the special theory of relativity is the special case of general relativity in the limit G → 0.

Similarly, in the theories where the effects of quantum mechanics are irrelevant, the value of Planck constant (h) can be neglected. For example, setting h → 0 in the commutation relation of quantum mechanics, the uncertainty in the simultaneous measurement of two conjugate variables tends to zero, approximating quantum mechanics with classical mechanics.

In popular culture
 George Gamow chose "C. G. H." as the initials of his fictitious character, Mr C. G. H. Tompkins.

References

Theoretical physics